Accuser may refer to:
 Someone who accuses
 Satan, whose name means "accuser" (or "adversary") in Hebrew
 Accuser (band), German thrash metal band
 The Accusers, a crime novel
 The Accuser (animated series), a series produced by Stan Lee
 The Accuser (film), a 1977 French film
 Ronan the Accuser, a Marvel Comics character